Konstantin Vladimirovich Kotyanovsky (Kanstancin Uladzimiravič Chacianoŭski; , Konstantin Vladimirovich Khotynovsky), was a Belarusian painter and artist.

He graduated from the Belarusian State Theater and Art Institute in 1976. He studied under Pavel Semchenko and L.Tolbuzin. He actively participated in art exhibitions since 1980. Works in the fields of posters, book graphics, design. He was a member of the Belarusian Union of Artists since 1988.

His works are currently stored in the Belarusian National Arts Museum, in the Museum of Modern Art in Toyama, Japan, in the Poster Museum in Wilanów, Poland, in the Museum of Art of the University of Connecticut in the United States, in the BSH Fund, and in the Central House of Artists in Moscow.

Currently, he works as a director of the publishing house "Cavalier" since 1994.

Main works

Posters 
 First Minsk Festival of Sacred Music 
 Perestroika 
 Last Page of the Red Book 
 The Fate of the Planet is Your Destiny 
 I am - but who am I?

References 

1954 births
Living people
Belarusian State Academy of Arts alumni
Belarusian artists